The Culture, History and Study Committee of the Chinese People's Political Consultative Conference is one of ten special committees of the Chinese People's Political Consultative Conference, China's top political advisory body and a central part of the Chinese Communist Party's united front system.

History 
The Culture, History and Study Committee was created in March 2018 during the 13th Chinese People's Political Consultative Conference.

List of chairpersons

References 

Special committees of the Chinese People's Political Consultative Conference
Organizations established in 2018
2018 establishments in China